In military terms, 126th Division or 126th Infantry Division may refer to:

 126th Division (People's Republic of China)
 126th Infantry Division (Wehrmacht)
 126th Division (Imperial Japanese Army)